Titus Sextius Magius Lateranus was a Roman Senator who lived during the second half of the 1st century and first half of the 2nd century. Lateranus served as a consul  in 94 as the colleague of Lucius Nonius Calpurnius Torquatus Asprenas. He is known entirely from inscriptions.

In his monograph on Roman naming practices, Olli Salomies points out that the short form of his name was Titus Sextius Lateranus, showing he was a member of the gens Sextia. Based on the inscription  his relatives included Titus Sextius Africanus, suffect consul in 59. The third element in his name, "Magia", may indicate his mother came from the Magii, a praetorian family. 

Lateranus married the Roman noblewoman Volussia Torquata, one of the children of Quintus Volusius Saturninus and his wife Nonia Torquata. Their children included Titus Sextius Cornelius Africanus, who served as a consul in 112.

References

Sources
Julian Bennett, Trajan: Optimus Princeps: a Life and Times, Routledge, 1997
Biographischer Index der Antike (Google eBook), Walter de Gruyter, 2001

1st-century Romans
2nd-century Romans
Imperial Roman consuls
Magius Lateranus, Titus (consul 847 AUC)